Ola Josefsson (born 7 September 1967) is a retired Swedish ice hockey player. Josefsson was part of the Djurgården Swedish champions' team of 1989, 1990, and 1991. Josefsson made 273 Elitserien appearances for Djurgården.

References

Swedish ice hockey players
Djurgårdens IF Hockey players
1967 births
Living people